Gdańsk Lipce railway station is a railway station serving the city of Gdańsk, in the Pomeranian Voivodeship, Poland. The station   is located on the Warsaw–Gdańsk railway. The train services are operated by Przewozy Regionalne.

The station used to be known as Guteherberge.

Modernisation

The station was modernised in 2012 which included rebuilding the platforms.

Train services
The station is served by the following services:

Regional services (R) Gdynia - Sopot - Gdansk - Tczew - Malbork - Elblag - Ilawa - Olsztyn
Regional services (R) Gdynia - Sopot - Gdansk - Tczew - Laskowice - Bydgoszcz

References

 This article is based upon a translation of the Polish language version as of October 2016.

External links

Lipce
Disused railway stations in Pomeranian Voivodeship